Religious music in Iran is rich in melodies and genres. Iran is a multi cultural land, where various faiths exist.  Each faith has its own associated music and ritual. Iranian religious music is defined as the music that has been used in streets, mosques, holy places and on religious occasions.

 Zoroastrian religious music in Iran
 Islamic religious music in Iran
 Noheh and Rozeh Khani
 Sham e Ghariban
 Prayer music
 Iranian Azan
The most well-known Iranian performance of Azan dates back to 1955 performed by renowned Iranian religious singer, Rahim Moazenzadeh.
 
Christian religious music in Iran
Jewish religious music in Iran
Baháʼí religious music in Iran

Notes

See also 
 Music of Iran
 Islamic music

Iranian music
Religious music